Holiday is a census-designated place (CDP) in Pasco County, Florida, United States. It is a suburb of the Tampa-St. Petersburg-Clearwater, Florida Metropolitan Statistical Area. The population was 22,403 as of the 2010 census.

In the early 1960s, William W. Boyd, president of First Federal Savings and Loan Association of Tarpon Springs, noted the name Holiday Drive on a map near the site of the proposed branch to be built in southwestern Pasco County and asked his board of directors to give the name to the new branch. Later Boyd began drumming up support to name the community Holiday.

Geography
Holiday is located in west central Florida northwest of Tampa Bay on the Gulf of Mexico,
at  (28.183890, −82.742886).

Demographics

As of the census of 2010, there were 22,403 people and 9,505 households residing in the CDP.  The racial makeup of the CDP was 82.7% White, 4.1% African American, 0.5% Native American, 1.4% Asian, and Hispanic or Latino of any race were 10.0% of the population. The population density per square mile was 4,168.8.

There were 9,505 households. The average persons living in a household was 2.31. The home ownership rate was 73.8%. The median value of owner-occupied units was $97,600. There were 12,484 housing units.

In the CDP, the population was spread out, with 20.0% of children under 18 (5.8% under 5) and 21.2% who were 65 years of age or older. The female population was 51.4%. High school graduates or higher of ages 25+ was 82.4%. Bachelor's degree or higher of ages 25+ was 10.1%. There were 2,887 veterans.

The per capita income was $19,947 and the median household income was $36,888.

Buildings and structures 
 Holiday Pacific and Southern Tower. At 1538 ft., this antenna tower is one of the tallest structures on the west coast of Florida.
Southeast Personnel, is a six-story structure located at 2739 US-19, Holiday, FL 34691.
 Holiday Towers, located at 2435 US-19, Holiday, FL 34691.  The Holiday Towers is home to the National Comedy Hall of Fame Museum, the National Comedy Hall of Fame Event Center, the National Comedy Hall of Fame Comedy School, and one of the longest running escape room businesses in Tampa,  Race to Escape (an escape room experience with 7 permanent games and one seasonal). 
 Duke Energy Power Plant (Anclote Power Plant), located at 1729 Baillies Bluff Road, Holiday, FL 34691.
 Sun Toyota, located at 3001 US-19, Holiday, FL 34691.
Fairfield Inn & Suites Holiday Tarpon Springs, located at 3060 US-19, Holiday, FL 34691.
TAT Civic Association

Borders and neighborhoods 
Holiday is bordered on the south by the City of Tarpon Springs/Pinellas County Line, the Gulf of Mexico on the west (with access from the Anclote River Park, Gulf Park, and Key Vista Park in Holiday), the city of New Port Richey to the north, and Trinity to the east.

Holiday is divided into many neighborhoods, which include:
 Aloha Gardens
 Baillies Bluff
 Beacon Square
 Colonial Hills
 Crest Ridge Gardens
 Forest Hills
 Forest Hills East
 Gulf Trace
 Gulf Winds
 Holiday Lake Estates
 Holiday Lake Villas
 Holiday Lake West
 Key Vista
 La Villa Gardens
 Sand Bay
 Westwood

Schools

Holiday is part of the Pasco County School System.

There are three elementary schools in Holiday:
 Gulfside Elementary School
Sunray Elementary
 Gulf Trace Elementary School

There is one middle school:
 Paul R. Smith Middle School (named after United States Army Sergeant First Class Paul Ray Smith, who was posthumously awarded the Medal of Honor for his actions on 4 April 2003 during the invasion of Iraq).

There is one high school:
 Anclote High School (named after the Anclote River)

Private Schools:
 Web of Wisdom, serves students grades K-12. Located at 5238 Mile Stretch Dr, Holiday, FL 34690.
 World of Knowledge, a Montessori School, serves students pre-kindergarten-12. Located at 1935 Abacus Road, Holiday, Florida 34690.

References 

Census-designated places in Pasco County, Florida
Census-designated places in Florida